Marlou van Rhijn (born 22 October 1991) is a retired professional Dutch former professional sprint runner. Van Rhijn, who was born without lower legs, is the world record holder for T43 in the 100 and 200 metres events and ran with the aid of carbon fibre transtibial artificial limbs. She competed in T44 (single below knee incapacity) events though she was classified in T43 (double below knee). She announced her retirement in June 2021.

Personal
Marlou van Rhijn was born on 22 October 1991 in Monnickendam in the Netherlands.

She studied commercial economics at the Johan Cruyff Institute in Amsterdam.

Swimming
Until 2009, Van Rhijn was a member of the national team for swimmers with a disability. Amongst others, she was swimming at a World and a European championship. She swam several Dutch national records. She competed in the S9 class and focused on the 50 and 100 meter freestyle. She stopped swimming competitively in 2010 due to lack of motivation.

Athletics
Van Rhijn switched sports in 2010, after being approached by Guido Bonsen, coach of the Dutch Parathletics Team. She did a trial, and was hooked. Van Rhijn became a member of the Dutch Parathletics Team of the Koninklijke Nederlandse Atletiek Unie. Despite qualifying as T43, she competes in the class T44 at the 100 and 200 meters. She qualified for the 2012 Summer Paralympics in May 2012, while competing at the Stadio Olimpico. She was invested as a Knight of the Order of Orange-Nassau after winning her Paralympic medals.

She left the national paralympic team. She started training after the Paralympic Games in Ookmeer, Amsterdam with her new coach Parcy Marte, who also trains non-paralympic people.

In the build up to the 2016 Summer Paralympics she was supportive of Shardea Arias de la Cruz when she decided to create a Paralympic committee and team for the small island nation of Aruba.

Achievements

Athletics

Swimming

References

External links

 
 
 Marlou van Rhijn at London 2012
 Marlou van Rhijn at the Koninklijke Nederlandse Atletiek Unie 
 Personal swimming records of Marlou van Rhijn 

1991 births
Living people
Sprinters with limb difference
Athletes (track and field) at the 2012 Summer Paralympics
Athletes (track and field) at the 2016 Summer Paralympics
Dutch female sprinters
Knights of the Order of Orange-Nassau
Medalists at the 2012 Summer Paralympics
Medalists at the 2016 Summer Paralympics
Paralympic athletes of the Netherlands
Paralympic gold medalists for the Netherlands
Paralympic silver medalists for the Netherlands
People from Monnickendam
World record holders in Paralympic athletics
World Para Athletics Championships winners
Medalists at the World Para Athletics European Championships
Paralympic medalists in athletics (track and field)
Sportspeople from North Holland
Paralympic sprinters
20th-century Dutch women
20th-century Dutch people
21st-century Dutch women